This is a list of notable Serbian painters.

A
 Nikola Aleksić (1808–1873)
 Dimitrije Avramović (1815–1855)
 Ljubomir Aleksandrović (1828–1890)
 Stevan Aleksić (1876–1923)
 Dragomir Arambašić (1881–1945)
 Stojan Aralica (1883–1980)
 Đorđe Andrejević Kun (1904–1964)
 Mika Antić (1932–1986)
 Dragoslav Pavle Aksentijević (born 1942)
 Marina Abramović (born 1946)
 Nataša Atanasković (born 1972)
 Emanuil Antonovich (1785–1829)

B
 Nikola Božidarević (1460–1517)
 Dimitrije Bačević (1735–1770)
 Georgije Bakalović (1786–1843)
 Anastas Bocarić (1864–1944)
 Špiro Bocarić (1876–1941)
 Jovan Bijelić (c.1884–1964)
 Ilija Bašičević (1895–1972)
 Oto Bihalji-Merin (1904–1993)
 Dimitrije Bratoglic (1765–1831)
 Janko Brašić (1906–1994)
 Miloš Bajić (1915–1995)
 Radivoj Berbakov (1925–2003)
 Kossa Bokchan (1925–2009)
 Ivana Bašić (born 1986)

C
 Gala Čaki (born 1987)
 Teodor Ilić Češljar (1746–1793)
 Petar Čortanović (1800–1868)
 Pavle Čortanović (1830–1903)
 Natalija Cvetković (1888–1928)
 Marko Čelebonović (1902–1986)
 Zuzana Chalupová (1925–2001)
 Mihailo Čanak (1932–2014)

D
 Lovro Dobričević (1420–1478)
 Kozma Damjanović (c. 1650–after 1704)
 Grigorije Davidović-Obšić (18th century)
 Pavel Đurković (1772–1830)
 Konstantin Danil (1798–1873)
 Dragutin Inkiostri Medenjak (1866–1942)
 Petar Dobrović (1890–1942)
 Radomir Damnjanović Damnjan (born 1935)
 Dragana Đorđević (born 1960)
 Uroš Đurić (born 1964)
 Frano Menegello Dinčić (1900-1986)

F
 Emerik Feješ (1904–1969)
 Ilija Fonlamov Francisković (born 1996)

G
 Stefan Gavrilović (c. 1750–1823)
 Teodor Stefanov Gologlavac (18th century)
 Mališa Glišić (1886–1916)
 Miloš Golubović (1888–1961)
 Nedeljko Gvozdenović (1902–1988)
 Aleksa Gajić (born 1974)

H
 Janko Halkozović (18th century)
 Kosta Hakman (1889–1961)

I
 Jovan Isailović (c. 1756–1825)
 Jovan Isailović, Jr. (1803–1885)
 Katarina Ivanović (1817–1882)
 Ljubomir Ivanović (1882–1945)
 Olja Ivanjicki (1931–2009)

J
 Amvrosije Janković (18th century)
 Đura Jakšić (1832–1878)
 Živko Jugović (1855–1908)
 Paja Jovanović (1859–1957)
 Đorđe Jovanović (1861–1953)
 Svetislav Jovanović (1861–1933)
 Danica Jovanović (1886–1914)
 Kosta Josipović (1887–1919)
 Mladen Josić (1897–1972)
 Ljubinka Jovanović (1922–2015)

K
 Kyr Kozma (c. 1560–c. 1640)
 Sava Krabulević (c. 1650–after 1706)
 Teodor Kračun (1730–1781)	
 Uroš Knežević (1811–1876)	
 Mina Karadžić (1828–1894)
 Đorđe Krstić (1851–1907)
 Leon Koen (1859–1934)
 Kiril Kutlik (1869–1900)
 Stepan Kolesnikoff (1879–1955)
 Milan Konjović (1898–1993)	
 Ferenc Kalmar (1928–2013)
 Momo Kapor (1937–2010)
 Stevan Knežević (1940–1995)
 Dragoš Kalajić (1943–2005)
 Vladimir Krstić (born 1959)
 Ivan Kovalčik Mileševac (born 1968)

L
 Zograf Longin (16th century)
 Stefan Likić (c. 1680–c. 1750)
 Simeon Lazović (c. 1745–1817)
 Aleksije Lazović (1774–1837))
 Andjelija Lazarević (1885–1926)
 Lazar Licenoski (1901–1964)
 Vladislav Lalicki (1935–2008)
 Lazar Licenoski (1901–1964)

M
 Georgije Mitrofanović (c.1550–c.1630)
 Ostoja Mrkojević (1630–1699)
 Joakim Marković (1685–1757)
 Petar Nikolajević Moler (1775–1816)
 Janja Moler (real name: Jovan Stergević, 1780–1841)
 Janko Mihailović Moler (1792–1853)
 Aksentije Marodić (1838–1909)
 Marko Murat (1864–1944)
 Dragutin Inkiostri Medenjak (1866–1942)
 Rafailo Momčilović (1875–1941)
 Milan Milovanović (1876–1946)
 Kosta Miličević (1877–1920)
 Mihailo Milovanović (1879–1941)
 Ana Marinković (1881–1972)
 Todor Manojlović (1883–1968)
 Milan Minić (1889–1961)
 Ljubomir Micić (1895–1971)
 Predrag Milosavljević (1908–1989)
 Svetislav Mandić (1921–2005)
 Milorad Bata Mihailović (1923–2011)
 Milić od Mačve (1934–2000)
 Dobrosav Milojevic (born 1948)
 Milovan Destil Marković (born 1957)
 Petar Meseldžija (born 1965)
 Mihael Milunović (born 1967)

N
 Nikola Nešković (1740–1789)
 Hadži Ruvim Nedeljković (1752–1804)
 Petar Nikolajević Moler (1775–1816)
 Živorad Nastasijević (1893–1966)

O
 Zaharije Orfelin (1726–1785)
 Vasa Ostojić (1730–1791)
 Grigorije Davidović-Obšić (c. 1745–after 1800)
 Jakov Orfelin (c. 1750–1803)
 Petar Omčikus (1926–2019)
 Dušan Otašević (born 1940)

P
 Jovan Pačić (1771–1849)
 Jeftimije Popović (1792–1876)
 Jovan Popović (1810–1864)
 Pavel Petrović (1818–1887)
 Živko Pavlović (19th century)
 Uroš Predić (1857–1953)
 Petar Popović (1873–1945)
 Nadežda Petrović (1873–1915)
 Dragoljub Pavlović (1875–1956)
 Branko Popović (1882–1944)
 Pero Popović (1882–1931)
 Petar Palaviccini (1887–1958)
 Miodrag Petrović (1888–1950)
 Sava Petrovic (painter) (1788-1857)
 Pavel Petrović (1818–1887)
 Vasa Pomorišac (1893–1961)
 Zora Petrović (1894–1962)
 Branko Ve Poljanski (1898–1947)
 Mihajlo Petrov (1902–1983)
 Milena Pavlović-Barili (1909–1945)
 Miodrag B. Protić (1922–2014)
 Mića Popović (1923–1996)
 Ljubomir Popović (1934–2016)
 Đorđe Prudnikov (1939–2017)
 Neša Paripović (born 1942)
 Slobodan Pejić (1944–2006)
 Relja Penezic (born 1950)
 Slobodan Peladic (born 1962)

R
 Radoslav (15th century)
 Andrija Raičević (c. 1610–1673)
 Zograf Radul (c. 1630–c. 1690)
 Vasilije Romanovich (c. 1700–1773)
 Novak Radonić (1826–1890)
 Simeon Roksandić (1874–1943)
 Toma Rosandić (1878–1958)
 Branko Radulović (1881–1916)
 Ivan Radović (1894–1973)
 Božidar Rašica (1912–1992)
 Radomir Reljić (1938–2006)
 Savo Radulović (1911–1991)

S
 Monk Simeon (fl. 1196–1202)
 Lazar Serdanović (1744–1799)
 Jovan Stergević (1780–1841)
 Pavle Simić (1818–1876)
 Adam Stefanović (1832–1887)
 Iva Despić-Simonović (1891–1961)
 Veljko Stanojević (1892–1967)
 Sava Šumanović (1896–1942)
 Živko Stojsavljević (1900–1978)
 Ljubica Sokić (1914–2009)
 Sava Stojkov (1925–2014)
 Mladen Srbinović (1925–2009)
 Radomir Stević Ras (1931–1982)
 Slobodan Škerović (born 1954)
 Gradimir Smudja (born 1956)
 Jovanka Stanojević (born 1979)

T
 Pahomije Tenecki (17th century)
 Georgije Tenecki (18th century)
 Stefan Tenecki (1720–1798)
 Arsenije Teodorović (1767–1826)
 Stevan Todorović (1832–1925)
 Vladislav Titelbah (1847–1925)
 Ivan Tabaković (1898–1977)
 Dragan Malešević Tapi (1949–2002)
 Rade Tovladijac (born 1961)

U
 Petar Ubavkić (1852–1910)

V
 Jov Vasilijevich (1700–1760)
 Paško Vučetić (1871–1925)
 Beta Vukanović (1872–1972)
 Rista Vukanović (1873–1918)
 Ljubiša Valić (1873–1950)
 Vukosava Velimirović (1888–1965)
 Miloš Vušković (1900–1975)
 Draginja Vlasic (1928–2011)
 Vladimir Veličković (1935–2019)
 Vuk Vidor (born 1965)

Z
 Zograf Longin (16th century)
 Hristofor Žefarović (c. 1690–1753)
 Jovan Zonjić (1907–1961)
 Dušan Zivlak (born 1950)

See also
 Serbian art
 List of Serbs
 List of Serbian architects

References

 
Serbian painters
Painters